Kim Jae-yeon may refer to:

Kim Jae-yeon (water polo)
Kim Jae-yeon (politician)

See also
Kim Jae-young (disambiguation)